Tesnatee Gap is a mountain pass in the U.S. state of Georgia.

Tesnatee is a name derived from the Cherokee language meaning "wild turkey". Variant names are "Tessantee Gap" and "Tosnata Gap".
The pass is crossed by the　Appalachian trail.

References

Landforms of Union County, Georgia
Landforms of White County, Georgia
Mountain passes of Georgia (U.S. state)